Sir Christopher Stephen Wormald KCB (born 30 October 1968) is a British civil servant serving as Permanent Secretary of the Department of Health and Social Care since 2016, having previously served as Permanent Secretary of the Department for Education from 2012 to 2016.

Biography 
Educated at Rutlish School in Merton and then St John's College, Oxford, Wormald joined the Civil Service in 1991 into the Department for Education (later the Department for Education and Employment). Rising to Principal Private Secretary to the Secretary of State for Education and Skills from 2001 until 2004, he then worked on the Academies programme.

Wormald transferred in 2006 to the newly formed Department for Communities and Local Government (DCLG), promoted to be Director-General of Local Government and Regeneration. In 2009, he moved to the Cabinet Office as the Head of the Economic and Domestic Affairs Secretariat, taking over from Paul Britton. Following the general election in 2010 and the consequent change of the position of deputy prime minister, he additionally became Head of the Deputy Prime Minister's Office.

In March 2012, Wormald left the Cabinet Office to return to the Department for Education as its Permanent Secretary, replacing Sir David Bell who had retired to be the vice-chancellor of the University of Reading. As of 2015, Wormald was paid a salary of between £160,000 and £164,999 by DCLG, making him one of the 328 most highly paid people in the British public sector at that time. In January 2016 it was announced that Wormald would move to the Department of Health and Social Care later in 2016, to replace Dame Una O'Brien after her retirement as the permanent secretary there.

He was appointed Knight Commander of the Order of the Bath (KCB) in the 2017 Birthday Honours.

References

External links 
 Interview in Civil Service World with Wormald in 2013

 

Living people
1968 births
British Permanent Secretaries
Civil servants in the Cabinet Office
Civil servants in the Department of Education (United Kingdom)
Civil servants in the Department for Communities and Local Government
Permanent Under-Secretaries of State for Health
Knights Commander of the Order of the Bath